Grimmel may refer to:
Torben Grimmel, a Danish sport shooter
Colonel Leland Grimmel, a character in the web television series Alpha House
Grimmel, a fictional location in the manga The Wallflower
Grimmel, the main antagonist of the 2019 animated film How to Train Your Dragon: The Hidden World